Year 226 (CCXXVI) was a common year starting on Sunday (link will display the full calendar) of the Julian calendar. At the time, it was known as the Year of the Consulship of Severus and Marcellus (or, less frequently, year 979 Ab urbe condita). The denomination 226 for this year has been used since the early medieval period, when the Anno Domini calendar era became the prevalent method in Europe for naming years.

Events 
 By place 

 China 
 A merchant from the Roman Empire, called "Qin Lun" by the Chinese, arrives in Jiaozhi (modern Hanoi), and is taken to see King Sun Quan of Eastern Wu, who requests him to make a report on his native country and people. He is given an escort for the return trip, including a present of ten male and ten female "blackish-colored dwarfs." However, the officer in charge of the Chinese escort dies, and Qin Lun has to continue his journey home alone.

 Persian Empire 
 Ctesiphon, until now capital of the Parthian Empire, falls into the hands of the Sasanian Empire, who also make it their capital, after putting an end to the Parthian Dynasty in Iran.

Births 
 Lu Kang, Chinese general and politician (d. 274)
 Wang Bi (or Fusi), Chinese philosopher (d. 249)

Deaths 
 June 29 – Cao Pi, Chinese emperor (b. 187)
 Farn-Sasan, king of the Parthian Kingdom
 Shi Xie, Chinese politician and warlord (b. 137)
 Xiahou Shang (or Boren), Chinese general

References